Harold Dominey "Hal" Andrews (1942 – 1995) is a former broadcaster and politician in Newfoundland. He represented Burgeo-Bay d'Espoir in the Newfoundland House of Assembly from 1979 to 1985.

He was born in Twillingate and was educated at Bishop Feild College and Memorial University. Andrews worked for the Newfoundland Department of Agriculture, Forestry, Provincial Affairs and Fisheries. In 1966, he joined the CBC as a commentator-producer. Andrews hosted the television programme Land and Sea for the CBC. He resigned from the CBC in 1979.

He was elected to the Newfoundland assembly in a 1979 by-election. Andrews served in the provincial cabinet as Minister of Environment and Minister of Culture, Recreation and Youth. He was defeated by David Gilbert when he ran for reelection in 1985.

References 

1945 births
1995 deaths
Progressive Conservative Party of Newfoundland and Labrador MHAs
Members of the Executive Council of Newfoundland and Labrador
Canadian television hosts